Marcos Wilson da Silva (born 17 August 1995), known as Marcão, is a Brazilian professional footballer who plays for Londrina as a centre back.

Football career

On 27 June 2018, Marcão signed a  five years contract with Marítimo

References

External links

1995 births
Living people
Brazilian footballers
Brazilian expatriate footballers
Audax Rio de Janeiro Esporte Clube players
Luverdense Esporte Clube players
Alecrim Futebol Clube players
Tupi Football Club players
Treze Futebol Clube players
C.S. Marítimo players
Clube do Remo players
Sampaio Corrêa Futebol Clube players
Primeira Liga players
Campeonato Brasileiro Série C players
Association football defenders
Expatriate footballers in Portugal
Brazilian expatriate sportspeople in Portugal
Footballers from Rio de Janeiro (city)